The EuroCup Basketball All-EuroCup Team is an annual award of the secondary level European-wide professional club basketball league, the EuroCup. The EuroCup is the European-wide professional basketball league that is one tier level below the top-tier level EuroLeague. It is an award for the top ten players of each season of the EuroCup. The award began with the 2008–09 season.

Selection criteria
The All-EuroCup Team was originally selected solely by a panel of the league's basketball experts, from the 2008–09 season, through the 2015–16 season. Starting with the 2016–17 season, online fan voting was added to the award's selection process.

EuroCup Basketball All-EuroCup Team by season

All-EuroCup Team prior to online fan voting

Player nationality by national team.

All-EuroCup Team since addition of online fan voting

See also
EuroCup awards
EuroCup MVP
EuroCup Finals MVP
All-EuroLeague Team
EuroLeague awards
EuroLeague MVP
EuroLeague Final Four MVP

References

External links
EuroCup Basketball Official Web Page

Awards
European basketball awards